A napkin or serviette is a rectangle of cloth or paper used for wiping the mouth or fingers while eating.

Napkin may also refer to:
Sanitary napkin, a pad for menstrual control
 Term for a cloth diaper in the South African region, formerly in use in British English